Henbit may refer to:
 Any of several plant species with the common name "henbit":
 Lamium amplexicaule, wild flower known as henbit dead-nettle, common henbit, or greater henbit
 Lamium confertum, garden henbit
 Lamium maculatum, spotted henbit
 Veronica hederifolia, small henbit or ivy-leaved speedwell
 Lamium galeobdolon, yellow henbit or yellow archangel
 Lamium album, white henbit or archangel
 Plagiobothrys lamprocarpus, shinyfruit popcornflower, less commonly known as henbit dead-nettle
 Lamium purpureum, red henbit or red dead-nettle
 Monarda russeliana, Russells henbit or redpurple beebalm
 Henbit (horse) (1977–1997), racehorse